Starch or amylum is a polymeric carbohydrate consisting of numerous glucose units joined by  α-(1→4)-D glycosidic bonds. This polysaccharide is produced by most green plants for energy storage. Worldwide, it is the most common carbohydrate in human diets, and is contained in large amounts in staple foods such as wheat, potatoes, maize (corn), rice,  and cassava (manioc).

Pure starch is a white, tasteless and odorless powder that is insoluble in cold water or alcohol. It consists of two types of molecules: the linear and helical amylose and the branched amylopectin. Depending on the plant, starch generally contains 20 to 25% amylose and 75 to 80% amylopectin by weight. Glycogen, the energy reserve of animals, is a more highly branched version of amylopectin.

In industry, starch is often converted into sugars, for example by malting. These sugars may be fermented to produce ethanol in the manufacture of beer, whisky and biofuel. In addition, sugars produced from processed starch are used in many processed foods. 

Mixing most starches in warm water produces a paste, such as wheatpaste, which can be used as a thickening, stiffening or gluing agent. The principal non-food, industrial use of starch is as an adhesive in the papermaking process. A similar paste, can be applied to certain textile goods before ironing to stiffen them.

Etymology
The word "starch" is from its  Germanic root with the meanings "strong, stiff, strengthen, stiffen". Modern German Stärke (strength) is related and referring for centuries main application, the use in textile: sizing yarn for weaving and starching linen. The Greek term for starch, "amylon" (ἄμυλον), which means "not milled", is also related. It provides the root amyl, which is used as a prefix for several 5-carbon compounds related to or derived from starch (e.g. amyl alcohol).

History
Starch grains from the rhizomes of Typha (cattails, bullrushes) as flour have been identified from grinding stones in Europe dating back to 30,000 years ago. Starch grains from sorghum were found on grind stones in caves in Ngalue, Mozambique dating up to 100,000 years ago.

Pure extracted wheat starch paste was used in Ancient Egypt possibly to glue papyrus. The extraction of starch is first described in the Natural History of Pliny the Elder around AD 77–79. Romans used it also in cosmetic creams, to powder the hair and to thicken sauces. Persians and Indians used it to make dishes similar to gothumai wheat halva. Rice starch as surface treatment of paper has been used in paper production in China since 700 CE.

Starch industry

In addition to starchy plants consumed directly, by 2008 66 million tonnes of starch were being produced per year worldwide. In 2011, production was increased to 73 million ton.

In the EU the starch industry produced about 11 million tonnes in 2011, with around 40% being used for industrial applications and 60% for food uses, most of the latter as glucose syrups. In 2017 EU production was 11 million ton of which 9,4 million ton was consumed in the EU and of which 54% were starch sweeteners.

The US produced about 27.5 million tons of starch in 2017, of which about 8.2 million tons was high fructose syrup, 6.2 million tons was glucose syrups, and 2.5 million tons were starch products. The rest of the starch was used for producing ethanol (1.6 billion gallons).

Energy store of plants

Most green plants store energy as starch, which is packed into semicrystalline granules.  The extra glucose is changed into starch which is more complex than the glucose produced by plants. Young plants live on this stored energy in their roots, seeds, and fruits until it can find suitable soil in which to grow. An exception is the family Asteraceae (asters, daisies and sunflowers), where starch is replaced by the fructan inulin. Inulin-like fructans are  also present in grasses such as wheat, in onions and garlic, bananas, and asparagus.

In photosynthesis, plants use light energy to produce glucose from carbon dioxide. The glucose is used to generate the chemical energy required for general metabolism, to make organic compounds such as nucleic acids, lipids, proteins and structural polysaccharides such as cellulose, or is stored in the form of starch granules, in amyloplasts. Toward the end of the growing season, starch accumulates in twigs of trees near the buds. Fruit, seeds, rhizomes, and tubers store starch to prepare for the next growing season.

Green algae and land-plants store their starch in the plastids, while red algae, glaucophytes, cryptomonads, dinoflagellates and the parasitic apicomplexa store a similar type of polysaccharide called floridean starch in their cytosol or periplast.

Glucose is soluble in water, hydrophilic, binds with water and then takes up much space and is osmotically active; glucose in the form of starch, on the other hand, is not soluble, therefore osmotically inactive and can be stored much more compactly. The semicrystalline granules generally consist of concentric layers of amylose and amylopectin which can be made bioavailable upon cellular demand in the plant.

Glucose molecules are bound in starch by the easily  hydrolyzed alpha bonds. The same type of bond is found in the animal reserve polysaccharide glycogen. This is in contrast to many structural polysaccharides such as chitin, cellulose and peptidoglycan, which are bound by beta bonds and are much more resistant to hydrolysis.

Biosynthesis
Plants produce starch by first converting glucose 1-phosphate to ADP-glucose using the enzyme glucose-1-phosphate adenylyltransferase. This step requires energy in the form of ATP. The enzyme starch synthase then adds the ADP-glucose via a 1,4-alpha glycosidic bond to a growing chain of glucose residues, liberating ADP and creating amylose. The ADP-glucose is almost certainly added to the non-reducing end of the amylose polymer, as the UDP-glucose is added to the non-reducing end of glycogen during glycogen synthesis.

Starch branching enzyme introduces 1,6-alpha glycosidic bonds between the amylose chains, creating the branched amylopectin. The starch debranching enzyme isoamylase removes some of these branches. Several isoforms of these enzymes exist, leading to a highly complex synthesis process.

Glycogen and amylopectin have similar structure, but the former has about one branch point per ten 1,4-alpha bonds, compared to about one branch point per thirty 1,4-alpha bonds in amylopectin. Amylopectin is synthesized from ADP-glucose while mammals and fungi synthesize glycogen from UDP-glucose; for most cases, bacteria synthesize glycogen from ADP-glucose (analogous to starch).

In addition to starch synthesis in plants, starch can be synthesized from non-food starch mediated by an enzyme cocktail. In this cell-free biosystem, beta-1,4-glycosidic bond-linked cellulose is partially hydrolyzed to cellobiose. Cellobiose phosphorylase cleaves to glucose 1-phosphate and glucose; the other enzyme—potato alpha-glucan phosphorylase can add a glucose unit from glucose 1-phosphorylase to the non-reducing ends of starch. In it, phosphate is internally recycled. The other product, glucose, can be assimilated by a yeast. This cell-free bioprocessing does not need any costly chemical and energy input, can be conducted in aqueous solution, and does not have sugar losses.

Degradation
Starch is synthesized in plant leaves during the day and stored as granules; it serves as an energy source at night. The insoluble, highly branched starch chains have to be phosphorylated in order to be accessible for degrading enzymes. The enzyme glucan, water dikinase (GWD) phosphorylates at the C-6 position of a glucose molecule, close to the chains 1,6-alpha branching bonds. A second enzyme, phosphoglucan, water dikinase (PWD) phosphorylates the glucose molecule at the C-3 position. A loss of these enzymes, for example a loss of the GWD, leads to a starch excess (sex) phenotype,  and because starch cannot be phosphorylated, it accumulates in the plastids.

After the phosphorylation, the first degrading enzyme, beta-amylase (BAM) can attack the glucose chain at its non-reducing end. Maltose is released as the main product of starch degradation. If the glucose chain consists of three or fewer molecules, BAM cannot release maltose. A second enzyme, disproportionating enzyme-1 (DPE1), combines two maltotriose molecules. From this chain, a glucose molecule is released. Now, BAM can release another maltose molecule from the remaining chain. This cycle repeats until starch is degraded completely.  If BAM comes close to the phosphorylated branching point of the glucose chain, it can no longer release maltose. In order for the phosphorylated chain to be degraded, the enzyme isoamylase (ISA) is required.

The products of starch degradation are predominantly maltose and smaller amounts of glucose. These molecules are exported from the plastid to the cytosol, maltose via the maltose transporter, which if mutated (MEX1-mutant) results in maltose accumulation in the plastid.  Glucose is exported via the plastidic glucose translocator (pGlcT).  These two sugars act as a precursor for sucrose synthesis. Sucrose can then be used in the oxidative pentose phosphate pathway in the mitochondria, to generate ATP at night.

Properties

Structure

While amylose was thought to be completely unbranched, it is now known that some of its molecules contain a few branch points.
Amylose is a much smaller molecule than amylopectin. About one quarter of the mass of stored starch in plants consist of amylose, although there are about 150 times more amylose than amylopectin molecules.

Accumulated starch within plants is stored in semi-crystalline granules. Each plant species has a unique starch granular size:  rice starch is relatively small (about 2 μm), potato starches have larger granules (up to 100 μm) and wheat and tapioca all in-between.  Unlike other botanical sources of starch, wheat starch has a bimodal size distribution, with both smaller and larger granules ranging from 2 to 55 μm.

Some cultivated plant varieties have pure amylopectin starch without amylose, known as waxy starches. The most used is waxy maize, others are glutinous rice and waxy potato starch. Waxy starches undergo less retrogradation, resulting in a more stable paste. A maize cultivar with a relatively high proportion of amylose starch, amylomaize, is cultivated for the use of its gel strength and for use as a resistant starch (a starch that resists digestion) in food products.

Synthetic amylose made from cellulose has a well-controlled degree of polymerization. Therefore, it can be used as a potential drug deliver carrier.

Dissolution and gelatinization 
When heated in abundant water, the granules of native starch swell and burst, the semi-crystalline structure is lost, and the smaller amylose molecules start leaching out of the granule, forming a network that holds water and increasing the mixture's viscosity. This process is called starch gelatinization. The gelatinization temperature of starch varies depending on starch cultivar, amylose/amylopectin content, and water content. Starch with water could experience complex multiphase transitions during differential scanning calorimetry (DSC) temperature scanning. For starch with excess water, a single gelatinisation endotherm can be usually observed in the low temperature range (54–73 °C). By reducing the water content (<64%) in starch, more endothermic transitions representing different structural changes can be seen because they become separated and they will move to higher temperatures. With limited water content, the swelling forces will be much less significant, and the process of gelatinization in a low moisture content environment could more accurately be defined as the "melting" of starch. Besides, the number of endotherms and enthalpies depended on amylose/amylopectin ratio, and the gelatinisation enthalpy of the amylopectin-rich starch was higher than that of the amylose-rich starch. Specifically, waxy and normal maize starches show a large gelatinization endotherm at about 70 °C; for normal maize starches, there was also a second endotherm at about 90 °C, considered as the phase transition within an amylose–lipid complex; In contrast, for high-amylose content starches (e.g. Gelose 50 and Gelose 80), there is a very broad endotherm in the temperature range between 65 and 115 °C, which is composed of the main gelatinization endotherm and the phase transition within an amylose–lipid complex.

During cooking, the starch becomes a paste and increases further in viscosity. During cooling or prolonged storage of the paste, the semi-crystalline structure partially recovers and the starch paste thickens, expelling water. This is mainly caused by retrogradation of the amylose. This process is responsible for the hardening of bread or staling, and for the water layer on top of a starch gel (syneresis).

Certain starches, when mixed with water, will produce a non-Newtonian fluid sometimes nicknamed "oobleck".

Starch can also be dissolved or undergo gelation in ionic liquids or metal chloride salt solutions. The thermal transition of starch is largely influenced by the ratio of ionic liquid/water. Aqueous ionic liquid with a certain ionic liquid/water ratio leads to the most effective structural disorganisation of some starches at significantly reduced temperature (even at room temperature). This phenomenon is very different from the dissolution of cellulose, as the latter occurs most efficiently in pure ionic liquids and any water contained in the ionic liquids will hinder the dissolution significantly. It is proposed that for starches with granule surface pores (e.g. millet, waxy maize, normal maize and wheat starches), the corrosion by the aqueous IL follows an inside-out pattern and the destruction to the granules is fast and even, whereas for starches with a relatively smooth surface (e.g. high-amylose maize, potato, purple yam and pea starches), the corrosion can only start from the surface and thus the change caused the aqueous IL is slow. Besides, starch, even high-amylose starch, can be fully dissolved by aqueous metal chloride salts (e.g. ZnCl2, CaCl2, and MgCl2) at moderate temperature (≤50 °C), and starch nanoparticles can form during this dissolution process.

Hydrolysis
The enzymes that break down or hydrolyze starch into the constituent sugars are known as amylases.

Alpha-amylases are found in plants and in animals. Human saliva is rich in amylase, and the pancreas also secretes the enzyme. Individuals from populations with a high-starch diet tend to have more amylase genes than those with low-starch diets;

Beta-amylase cuts starch into maltose units. This process is important in the digestion of starch and is also used in brewing, where amylase from the skin of seed grains is responsible for converting starch to maltose (Malting, Mashing).

Dextrinization
If starch is subjected to dry heat, it breaks down to form dextrins, also called "pyrodextrins" in this context. This break down process is known as dextrinization. (Pyro)dextrins are mainly yellow to brown in color and dextrinization is partially responsible for the browning of toasted bread.

Chemical tests

A triiodide (I3−) solution formed by mixing iodine and iodide (usually from potassium iodide) is used to test for starch; a dark blue color indicates the presence of starch. The details of this reaction are not fully known, but recent scientific work using single crystal X-ray crystallography and comparative Raman spectroscopy suggests that the final starch-iodine complex is similar to an infinite polyiodide chain like one found in a pyrroloperylene-iodine complex. The strength of the resulting blue color depends on the amount of amylose present. Waxy starches with little or no amylose present will color red. Benedict's test and Fehling's test is also done to indicate the presence of starch.

Starch indicator solution consisting of water, starch and iodide is often used in redox titrations: in the presence of an oxidizing agent the solution turns blue, in the presence of reducing agent the blue color disappears because triiodide (I3−) ions break up into three iodide ions, disassembling the starch-iodine complex. Starch solution was used as indicator for visualizing the periodic formation and consumption of triiodide intermediate in the Briggs-Rauscher oscillating reaction. The starch, however, changes the kinetics of the reaction steps involving triiodide ion. 
A 0.3% w/w solution is the standard concentration for a starch indicator. It is made by adding 3 grams of soluble starch to 1 liter of heated water; the solution is cooled before use (starch-iodine complex becomes unstable at temperatures above 35 °C).

Each species of plant has a unique type of starch granules in granular size, shape and crystallization pattern. Under the microscope, starch grains stained with iodine illuminated from behind with polarized light show a distinctive Maltese cross effect (also known as extinction cross and birefringence).

Food

Starch is the most common carbohydrate in the human diet and is contained in many staple foods. The major sources of starch intake worldwide are the cereals (rice, wheat, and maize) and the root vegetables (potatoes and cassava). Many other starchy foods are grown, some only in specific climates, including acorns, arrowroot, arracacha, bananas, barley, breadfruit, buckwheat, canna, colocasia, katakuri, kudzu, malanga, millet, oats, oca, polynesian arrowroot, sago, sorghum, sweet potatoes, rye, taro, chestnuts, water chestnuts, arrowroot and yams, and many kinds of beans, such as favas, lentils, mung beans, peas, and chickpeas.

Before processed foods, people consumed large amounts of uncooked and unprocessed starch-containing plants, which contained high amounts of resistant starch. Microbes within the large intestine ferment or consume the starch, producing short-chain fatty acids, which are used as energy, and support the maintenance and growth of the microbes. Upon cooking, starch is transformed from an insoluble, difficult-to-digest granule into readily accessible glucose chains with very different nutritional and functional properties. 

In current diets, highly processed foods are more easily digested and release more glucose in the small intestine—less starch reaches the large intestine and more energy is absorbed by the body. It is thought that this shift in energy delivery (as a result of eating more processed foods) may be one of the contributing factors to the development of metabolic disorders of modern life, including obesity and diabetes.

The amylose/amylopectin ratio, molecular weight and molecular fine structure influences the physicochemical properties as well as energy release of different types of starches. In addition, cooking and food processing significantly impacts starch digestibility and energy release.  Starch has been classified as rapidly digestible starch, slowly digestible starch and resistant starch, depending upon its digestion profile. Raw starch granules resist digestion by human enzymes and do not break down into glucose in the small intestine - they reach the large intestine instead and function as prebiotic dietary fiber. When starch granules are fully gelatinized and cooked, the starch becomes easily digestible and releases glucose quickly within the small intestine. When starchy foods are cooked and cooled, some of the glucose chains re-crystallize and become resistant to digestion again. Slowly digestible starch can be found in raw cereals, where digestion is slow but relatively complete within the small intestine. Widely used prepared foods containing starch are bread, pancakes, cereals, noodles, pasta, porridge and tortilla.

During cooking with high heat, sugars released from starch can react with amino acids via the Maillard reaction, forming advanced glycation end-products, (AGEs), contributing aromas, flavors and texture to foods. One example of a dietary AGE is acrylamide.  Recent evidence suggests that the intestinal fermentation of dietary AGEs may be associated with insulin resistance, atherosclerosis, diabetes and other inflammatory diseases. This may be due to the impact of AGEs on intestinal permeability.

Starch gelatinization during cake baking can be impaired by sugar competing for water, preventing gelatinization and improving texture.

Starch production

The starch industry extracts and refines starches from seeds, roots and tubers, by wet grinding, washing, sieving and drying. Today, the main commercial refined starches are cornstarch, tapioca, arrowroot, and wheat, rice, and potato starches. To a lesser extent, sources of refined starch are sweet potato, sago and mung bean. To this day, starch is extracted from more than 50 types of plants.

Untreated starch requires heat to thicken or gelatinize. When a starch is pre-cooked, it can then be used to thicken instantly in cold water. This is referred to as a pregelatinized starch.

Starch sugars

Starch can be hydrolyzed into simpler carbohydrates by acids, various enzymes, or a combination of the two. The resulting fragments are known as dextrins. The extent of conversion is typically quantified by dextrose equivalent (DE), which is roughly the fraction of the glycosidic bonds in starch that have been broken.

These starch sugars are by far the most common starch based food ingredient and are used as sweeteners in many drinks and foods. They include:

 Maltodextrin, a lightly hydrolyzed (DE 10–20) starch product used as a bland-tasting filler and thickener.
 Various glucose syrups (DE 30–70), also called corn syrups in the US, viscous solutions used as sweeteners and thickeners in many kinds of processed foods.
 Dextrose (DE 100), commercial glucose, prepared by the complete hydrolysis of starch.
 High fructose syrup, made by treating dextrose solutions with the enzyme glucose isomerase, until a substantial fraction of the glucose has been converted to fructose. In the U.S. high-fructose corn syrup is significantly cheaper than sugar, and is the principal sweetener used in processed foods and beverages. Fructose also has better microbiological stability. One kind of high fructose corn syrup, HFCS-55, is sweeter than sucrose because it is made with more fructose, while the sweetness of HFCS-42 is on par with sucrose.
 Sugar alcohols, such as maltitol, erythritol, sorbitol, mannitol and hydrogenated starch hydrolysate, are sweeteners made by reducing sugars.

Modified starches
A modified starch is a starch that has been chemically modified to allow the starch to function properly under conditions frequently encountered during processing or storage, such as high heat, high shear, low pH, freeze/thaw and cooling.

The modified food starches are E coded according to European Food Safety Authority and INS coded Food Additives according to the Codex Alimentarius:
 1400 Dextrin 
 1401 Acid-treated starch
 1402 Alkaline-treated starch
 1403 Bleached starch
 1404 Oxidized starch
 1405 Starches, enzyme-treated
 1410 Monostarch phosphate
 1412 Distarch phosphate
 1413 Phosphated distarch phosphate
 1414 Acetylated distarch phosphate
 1420 Starch acetate
 1422 Acetylated distarch adipate
 1440 Hydroxypropyl starch
 1442 Hydroxypropyl distarch phosphate
 1443 Hydroxypropyl distarch glycerol
 1450 Starch sodium octenyl succinate
 1451 Acetylated oxidized starch

INS 1400, 1401, 1402, 1403 and 1405 are in the EU food ingredients without an E-number. Typical modified starches for technical applications are cationic starches, hydroxyethyl starch and carboxymethylated starches.

Use as food additive
As an additive for food processing, food starches are typically used as thickeners and stabilizers in foods such as puddings, custards, soups, sauces, gravies, pie fillings, and salad dressings, and to make noodles and pastas. They function as thickeners, extenders, emulsion stabilizers and are exceptional binders in processed meats.

Gummed sweets such as jelly beans and wine gums are not manufactured using a mold in the conventional sense. A tray is filled with native starch and leveled. A positive mold is then pressed into the starch leaving an impression of 1,000 or so jelly beans. The jelly mix is then poured into the impressions and put onto a stove to set. This method greatly reduces the number of molds that must be manufactured.

Use in pharmaceutical industry 
In the pharmaceutical industry, starch is also used as an excipient, as tablet disintegrant, and as binder.

Resistant starch

Resistant starch is starch that escapes digestion in the small intestine of healthy individuals. High-amylose starch from wheat or corn has a higher gelatinization temperature than other types of starch, and retains its resistant starch content through baking, mild extrusion and other food processing techniques. It is used as an insoluble dietary fiber in processed foods such as bread, pasta, cookies, crackers, pretzels and other low moisture foods. It is also utilized as a dietary supplement for its health benefits. Published studies have shown that resistant starch helps to improve insulin sensitivity, reduces pro-inflammatory biomarkers interleukin 6 and tumor necrosis factor alpha and improves markers of colonic function.
It has been suggested that resistant starch contributes to the health benefits of intact whole grains.

Synthetic starch 
In 2021, researchers reported the world's first artificial synthesis of starch in the laboratory. A cell-free chemoenzymatic process was used to synthesize starch from CO2 and hydrogen. If the process is viable and can be scaled, it could substantially reduce land-, pesticide- and water-use as well as greenhouse gas emissions while increasing food security. The chemical pathway of 11 core reactions was drafted by computational pathway design and converts CO2 to starch at a rate that is ~8.5-fold higher than starch synthesis in maize.

Non-food applications

Papermaking
Papermaking is the largest non-food application for starches globally, consuming many millions of metric tons annually. In a typical sheet of copy paper for instance, the starch content may be as high as 8%. Both chemically modified and unmodified starches are used in papermaking. In the wet part of the papermaking process, generally called the "wet-end", the starches used are cationic and have a positive charge bound to the starch polymer. These starch derivatives associate with the anionic or negatively charged paper fibers / cellulose and inorganic fillers. Cationic starches together with other retention and internal sizing agents help to give the necessary strength properties to the paper web formed in the papermaking process (wet strength), and to provide strength to the final paper sheet (dry strength).

In the dry end of the papermaking process, the paper web is rewetted with a starch based solution. The process is called surface sizing. Starches used have been chemically, or enzymatically depolymerized at the paper mill or by the starch industry (oxidized starch). The size/starch solutions are applied to the paper web by means of various mechanical presses (size presses). Together with surface sizing agents the surface starches impart additional strength to the paper web and additionally provide water hold out or "size" for superior printing properties. Starch is also used in paper coatings as one of the binders for the coating formulations which include a mixture of pigments, binders and thickeners. Coated paper has improved smoothness, hardness, whiteness and gloss and thus improves printing characteristics.

Corrugated board adhesives
Corrugated board adhesives are the next largest application of non-food starches globally. Starch glues are mostly based on unmodified native starches, plus some additive such as borax and caustic soda. Part of the starch is gelatinized to carry the slurry of uncooked starches and prevent sedimentation. This opaque glue is called a SteinHall adhesive. The glue is applied on tips of the fluting. The fluted paper is pressed to paper called liner. This is then dried under high heat, which causes the rest of the uncooked starch in glue to swell/gelatinize. This gelatinizing makes the glue a fast and strong adhesive for corrugated board production.

Clothing starch

Clothing or laundry starch is a liquid  prepared by mixing a vegetable starch in water (unmodified starch only gels in water close to boiling point, while commercial products may not require heat), and is used in the laundering of clothes. Starch was widely used in Europe in the 16th and 17th centuries to stiffen the wide collars and ruffs of fine linen which surrounded the necks of the well-to-do. During the 19th and early 20th century it was stylish to stiffen the collars and sleeves of men's shirts and the ruffles of women's petticoats by starching them before the clean clothes were ironed. Starch gave clothing smooth, crisp edges, and had an additional practical purpose: dirt and sweat from a person's neck and wrists would stick to the starch rather than to the fibers of the clothing. The dirt would wash away along with the starch; after laundering, the starch would be reapplied. Starch is available in spray cans, in addition to the usual granules to mix with water.

Bioplastic 

Starch is an important natural polymer to make bioplastics. With water and plasticisers such as glycerol, starch can be processed into so-called "thermoplastic starch" using conventional polymer processing techniques such as extrusion, injection molding and compression molding. Since materials based on only native starch have poor processibility, mechanical properties and stability, more commonly modified starches (e.g. hydroxypropyl starch) are used and starch is combined with other polymers (preferably biodegradable polymers such as polycaprolactone), as some commercial products (e.g. PLANTIC™ HP and Mater-Bi®) available on the market.

Other
Another large non-food starch application is in the construction industry, where starch is used in the gypsum wall board manufacturing process. Chemically modified or unmodified starches are added to the stucco containing primarily gypsum. Top and bottom heavyweight sheets of paper are applied to the formulation, and the process is allowed to heat and cure to form the eventual rigid wall board. The starches act as a glue for the cured gypsum rock with the paper covering, and also provide rigidity to the board.

Starch is used in the manufacture of various adhesives or glues for book-binding, wallpaper adhesives, paper sack production, tube winding, gummed paper, envelope adhesives, school glues and bottle labeling. Sodium silicate can be added to reinforce these formula.

Textile chemicals from starch: warp sizing agents are used to reduce breaking of yarns during weaving. Starch is mainly used to size cotton based yarns. Modified starch is also used as textile printing thickener.
In oil exploration, starch is used to adjust the viscosity of drilling fluid, which is used to lubricate the drill head and suspend the grinding residue in petroleum extraction.
Starch is also used to make some packing peanuts, and some drop ceiling tiles.
In the printing industry, food grade starch is used in the manufacture of anti-set-off spray powder used to separate printed sheets of paper to avoid wet ink being set off.
For body powder, powdered corn starch is used as a substitute for talcum powder, and similarly in other health and beauty products.
Starch is used to produce various bioplastics, synthetic polymers that are biodegradable. An example is polylactic acid based on glucose from starch.
Glucose from starch can be further fermented to biofuel corn ethanol using the so-called wet milling process. Today most bioethanol production plants use the dry milling process to ferment corn or other feedstock directly to ethanol.
Hydrogen production could use glucose from starch as the raw material, using enzymes.

Occupational safety and health 
In the US the Occupational Safety and Health Administration (OSHA) has set the legal limit (Permissible exposure limit) for starch exposure in the workplace as 15 mg/m3 total exposure and 5 mg/m3 respiratory exposure over an 8-hour workday. The National Institute for Occupational Safety and Health (NIOSH) has set a Recommended exposure limit (REL) of 10 mg/m3 total exposure and 5 mg/m3 respiratory exposure over an 8-hour workday.

See also
 Acrylamide, which is present in fried and baked foods
 Destarch
 Starch analysis
 Resistant starch

References

External links

 CDC - NIOSH Pocket Guide to Chemical Hazards, information for workers

 
Nutrition
Carbohydrates
Edible thickening agents
Excipients
Printing